Vikram is a 2022 Indian Tamil-language action thriller film written and directed by Lokesh Kanagaraj. It is produced by Kamal Haasan who stars in the title role along with Vijay Sethupathi and Fahadh Faasil with Narain and Kalidas Jayaram in supporting roles. A spiritual successor of the 1986 film also named Vikram, it is the second installment in the Lokesh Cinematic Universe following Kaithi (2019).

Kanagaraj was signed by Haasan's Raaj Kamal Films International for a proposed script in late 2019, with Rajinikanth planned in the lead role; but that was delayed due to COVID-19 pandemic. Kanagaraj then announced another project in September 2020, featuring Haasan in the lead role as well as the producer. Its title Vikram was announced in November, and extensive pre-production work continued till early 2021. Principal photography began in July 2021 and ended in February 2022 with filming taking place across Tamil Nadu including Karaikudi, Chennai, Pondicherry, and Coimbatore. Vikram'''s soundtrack and score are composed by Anirudh Ravichander, with cinematography handled by Girish Gangadharan and editing done by Philomin Raj.Vikram was released theatrically on 3 June 2022. The film received critical acclaim, with praise directed towards the script, storylines, cinematography, action sequences, Anirudh's music, Kanagaraj's direction and the performances. Grossing over ₹432.5–500 crore (US$54–63 million), the film broke several records, becoming the second highest-grossing Tamil film of 2022.

 Plot 
  
After busting the consignment of Adaikalam and Anbu by Inspector Bejoy three months ago, Amar, the head of a black-ops team, is summoned by Police Chief Jose to bring justice to a group of masked vigilantes, who have killed Stephen Raj (following his arrest and subsequent release after being busted for helping Adaikalam and Anbu), ACP Prabhanjan and his foster father, Karnan. Amar leads the investigation by digging into Karnan's life, as his murder seems out of place, since Karnan was a common man and the other two were higher officials in the Narcotics division.

Amar learns about Karnan's recent addictions to alcohol, drugs and prostitutes, while at the same time being very protective of his infant foster grandson. While investigating, Amar acknowledged about two missing containers of drugs being hunted by Sandhanam, who runs a much bigger drug syndicate than Adaikalam, named Vetti Vagaiyara. The two containers had to be delivered to his cold-blooded smuggler boss 'Rolex', whose identity is unknown. If the drugs are delivered, Rolex will help Sandhanam form his own government; if not, Sandhanam and his family will be killed. He slowly figures that all of Karnan's addictions were a ruse to cover up a highly covert operation being run by him.

Meanwhile, Veerapandian, a PWD officer, assigns a meeting with other gangsters at a theatre, where he reveals that he, along with a contractor named Rudra Prathap, know the location of the drug containers as they want to bring the containers to Rolex, bypassing Sandhanam in the process. However, the masked vigilantes arrive and kill Veerapandian by slitting his throat. Amar and his team arrive at the scene through a tracking chip left behind by Karnan and successfully capture one of them, revealed to be Bejoy. Amar interrogates Bejoy, who reveals that his family was killed for his role in leading the earlier drug bust, leading him to don the mask and join the vigilantes. Realising that Rudra Prathap is also a target of the members, Amar and his team sneak into Rudra Pratap's daughter's wedding ceremony, where Rudra Prathap has also invited Sandhanam for protection, fearing for his life and family.

The masked men, along with their leader, arrive at Rudra Prathap's daughter's wedding, where the leader threatens Rudra Prathap by holding his daughter at knifepoint. The leader drags Rudra Prathap, and escapes from the wedding on a bike, leaving the other members to deal with Sandhanam. However, Sandhanam manages to defeat all of them. Amar chases the leader and finally confronts him. The leader makes a video call to Sandhanam and reveals himself to be Karnan, who is actually alive and had faked his death. Karnan kills Rudra Prathap by slitting his throat and escapes from the police. Amar reveals that Karnan is actually Vikram, who was the former commander of the black-ops squad's pilot batch. Vikram's team, consisting of 12 members, was disbanded after a botched mission in 1991 and its members were declared as terrorists.

Subsequently, the members and their families were hunted down and brutally murdered but Vikram and three other members of the team managed to survive. Amar meets up with Jose and figures out that Jose himself is Sandhanam's mole in the department and also involved in Prabhanjan's death. It is revealed that Prabhanjan was captured by Sandhanam with Jose's help. Sandhanam had interrogated Prabhanjan about the containers and upon Prabhanjan's refusal to divulge any information, the enraged Sandhanam murders him. This forces Jose, Veerapandian and Rudra Prathap to cover up the murder by making it look like a terrorist attack. Amar orchestrates a bomb blast at Sandhanam's house, which destroys his bungalow and his drug lab in the basement. Jose informs Sandhanam in the nick of time and everyone but Sandhanam's brother Elango manage to escape the blast. Jose reveals Vikram's and Amar's identity to Sandhanam.

Later, Vikram arrives at the prison and frees Bejoy and his team. Sandhanam brutally kills Amar's wife Gayathri by decapitating her and sends his men to attack and kill Vikram's daughter-in-law and grandson at Prabhanjan's house. Having deduced this, Vikram rushes to save them, where a team member of Vikram's Pilot Black squad and associate, Agent Tina, who was undercover as the domestic help of the house under the name Valliamma, is killed whilst protecting Vikram's daughter-in-law and grandson. Vikram finally manages to save them. Distraught at Gayathri's death, Amar joins Vikram's gang to take down Sandhanam and his syndicate. He leaves for Jose's house and kills him after learning about his involvement in Gayathri's murder.

It is revealed that the reason for Vikram's actions is not revenge for Prabhanjan’s death, but a drive to bust the drug syndicate in the city, which manifested in him through Prabhanjan's death. He also admits that Prabhanjan was his own biological son. Vikram and his grandson reach Chennai Port where the containers are hidden. Sandhanam learns about the location of the containers and attacks Vikram. Vikram mows down Sandhanam's men with a cannon and M2 Browning but the remaining members of his Pilot Black squad, Agents Uppiliappan and Lawrence are also killed in the action whilst trying to protect Vikram's grandson. Vikram blows up Sandhanam's containers and Sandhanam is killed in the ensuing blast. Amar mourns Gayathri's death and with the syndicate destroyed, he dons the grease paint to continue Vikram's mission, by joining his team, along with Bejoy.

In Sassoon Docks, Mumbai, Anbu and Adaikalam, arrive with their men. They meet up with the gangsters affiliated with Sandhanam and hold a meeting with their boss, Rolex. Adaikalam and Anbu reveal Dilli's involvement in the Trichy drug ambush, and Sandhanam's men reveal Vikram and Amar's involvement in destroying their drug syndicate and killing their leader. Rolex announces a huge sum as a reward for the execution of Amar, Dilli, and Vikram's team. They also reveal the current location of Dilli, in Bundelkhand, Uttar Pradesh, and Vikram's family in San Francisco. However, unknown to Rolex and everybody else at the meeting, Vikram is hiding amongst the gangsters and learns about the bounty placed on his team, Amar and Dilli.

 Cast 

 Production 
 Development 

Lokesh Kanagaraj was signed by Kamal Haasan's production house Raaj Kamal Films International to direct a film for the studio during November 2019. For which he had previously mentioned his admiration of Kamal Haasan's work, noting that two of the actor's films, Sathya (1988) and Virumaandi (2004), had influenced him to become a film director. Despite agreeing terms, both the director and the studio opted to prioritise commitments, for other films before beginning production work. Lokesh narrated the script of the proposed film to Rajinikanth during December 2019. The project which was tentatively titled as Thalaivar 169, was scheduled to be launched in March 2020. Despite the progress of discussions, the COVID-19 pandemic delayed the launch of the film.

In September 2020, Lokesh announced a different project, that would feature Kamal Haasan in the lead role. The film's official poster was released on 16 September 2020, which came under the tentative titles as Kamal Haasan 232, a 232nd film to Kamal Haasan and Evanendru Ninaithaai, a titular song from his film Vishwaroopam (2013), and it features Anirudh Ravichander scoring music for the film, collaborating with Kamal Haasan and Lokesh for the second time after Indian 2 and Master. The team shot for a promotional teaser of the film during October 2020 in Chennai, adhering to the COVID-19 safety regulations suggested by the Indian government. Coinciding with the actor's 66th birthday, 7 November 2020, the makers unveiled the title teaser of the film, featuring Kamal Haasan, in which the title of the film was revealed to be Vikram, a repeat of an earlier film of the same name, starring the actor which was released in 1986.

After Kamal Haasan's commitments during the 2021 Tamil Nadu legislative assembly elections, on 7 April, a post was shared by Lokesh Kanagaraj through his social media handles, anticipating that the pre-production works for the film had begun. Since Haasan decided to shoot for the film only after the election results, since he contested in the Coimbatore South constituency, he demanded Lokesh to make changes in the script, however, that was delayed due to the pandemic. Initially, it was planned as a single shooting schedule for 60 days, with a new technology, that would shorten the days of film production, being undisclosed, did not happen as plan. In the film, Kamal Haasan was reported to play a retired police officer and media reports stated that he will don a "khaki uniform" for this film, after 15 years since the Gautham Vasudev Menon-directorial Vettaiyaadu Vilaiyaadu (2006). He was reported to sport a thick beard in the film. For the flashback portions, Lokesh Kanagaraj reported to use de-aging technology for the film. The flashback sequence in its entirety, was eventually said to be cost around 10 crore, particularly for the technology used in the film. In April 2022, Lokesh had submitted the film's script at the Copyright Office, New Delhi for legal copyrights.

 Casting 

Lokesh roped in his norm technicians, cinematographer Sathyan Sooryan and editor Philomin Raj, who previously worked with the director in his projects for the film. However, due to schedule conflicts, Sooryan was replaced by Girish Gangadharan, in his second Tamil film after Sarkar (2018), whose inclusion was later confirmed by Lokesh in July 2021. Twin stunt choreographers Anbariv, were announced a part of the film's technical crew. This marked the duo's second collaboration with Lokesh after Kaithi (2019), where they received accolades for the stunt sequences.

Raghava Lawrence was initially approached to play the antagonist in the film during March 2021. However he stepped out of the project due to prior commitments. In April 2021, Fahadh Faasil confirmed his presence in acting in the film. The film marked Fahadh's third project in Tamil after Velaikkaran (2017) and Super Deluxe (2019). In May 2021, Vijay Sethupathi announced his confirmation in the project, collaborating with Lokesh for the second time after Master and first with Kamal Haasan. Antony Varghese who earlier stepped out of the director's previous film Master citing date issues agreed to play an integral part in the film, thus making his debut in Tamil, but later the news turned out to be false. Narain who appeared in a pivotal role in Lokesh's Kaithi too signed the project. Kalidas Jayaram was approached to be cast in a pivotal role in July 2021, where he portrays Haasan's son. It was revealed that Arjun Das also was approached for a role in the film, in his third consecutive association with the director Lokesh after Kaithi and Master. Later, it was confirmed that he would be seen in a cameo role in this film reprising his role from Kaithi.

In August 2021, television actress and one of the contestants of Bigg Boss Tamil series, Shivani Narayanan was roped in to play one of the three female leads paired opposite Sethupathi's character. In September, Mynaa Nandhini and Maheshwari Chanakyan were confirmed as the other two actresses. Swathishta Krishnan and Malayalam actor Chemban Vinod Jose, were cast in pivotal roles, the latter in his Tamil film debut. In October, popular Tamil-language YouTube channel, Village Cooking Channel team (M. Periyathambi, the grandson V. Subramanian and his cousins), were cast as a part of the film during the third schedule for a wedding sequence. In November 2021, Hareesh Peradi was also confirmed to star in a pivotal role. Later, in early-January 2022, veteran actor-director Santhana Bharathi joined the film's shoot. Actor Suriya confirmed he would also be seen in the film in a cameo appearance, where his scenes would appear approximately for 10 minutes. Kamal Haasan talked about Suriya's role at the Film Companion in the Cannes Film Festival stating that "It's no more a rumour. We had to put up our hand and admit that Suriya is playing an incredible last minute appearance. That should take the story a little further, probably into part 3."

 Filming 

The film's principal photography began with a photoshoot session on 16 July 2021. The team began shooting for the film's first schedule in Karaikudi on 6 August, which was delayed eventually since the shooting of Suriya's Etharkkum Thunindhavan, took place in the same location and the crew had to begin filming only after the crew members leave the location post-shooting, as per the COVID-19 safety regulations. The first schedule began on 20 August, and shooting took place for a month in Karaikudi. The team began second schedule of the film in Chennai on 19 September and later moved to Pondicherry, to shoot further sequences. The second schedule of the film was subsequently wrapped on 2 October 2021. On 13 October, the film makers started shooting for the third schedule of the film. The team planned to shoot two sequences at the Tamil Nadu Police Museum for four days, including two days of set work in 24–25 October and two days of shooting 27–28 October 2021, but the officials denied permission to shoot there, citing pandemic restrictions. The makers later decided to postpone the shoot, as they needed an alternative location.

The team began the final and month-long schedule on 17 November 2021 in Coimbatore, with scenes featuring Haasan, Sethupathi and Faasil being shot. However, filming was halted after Kamal Haasan was diagnosed with COVID-19 after his travel to the United States, for the inauguration of his clothing brand. This resulted in the team shooting major stunt sequences indoors. A set work with more than 50 damaged cars, had been shot in Coimbatore during this schedule, and following the actor's health condition, the team decided to shift the location to Binny Mills for continuity. Shooting resumed on 10 December 2021 with important sequences being canned with other actors and later Haasan joined the sets on 22 December.

In late-December 2021, the team continued shooting few sequences at a house located in East Coast Road at a quick pace. However, in early-January, the shoot had to be stalled after a few technicians working on the film were infected with COVID-19. The production cost simultaneously increased as the rent paid for the house was enormous, even on non-shooting days. Furthermore, Haasan's medical commitments and his participation in the Bigg Boss Ultimate show, delayed the shooting further, which resulted in the team skipping an entire schedule. Due to the rise in COVID-19 infections in Tamil Nadu, the team planned to shoot the film with minimal crew. On 24 January 2022, the team shot few sequences at the premises of Vettri Theatres in Chromepet (Chennai). The final filming schedule began on 5 February 2022, with face off scenes with Haasan and Sethupathi being shot for 15 days. To prioritise for the film's shooting, Haasan stepped down as the host for Bigg Boss Ultimate show, and participated for patchwork filming. On 1 March, it was announced that principal photography has been wrapped.

 Music 

The film's soundtrack and background score is composed by Anirudh Ravichander, making this his second collaboration with Lokesh Kanagaraj and Kamal Haasan after Master and Indian 2 respectively. The music rights were purchased by Sony Music India. Film's audio launch took place in a grand manner in Jawaharlal Nehru Indoor Stadium, Chennai on 15 May 2022.

 Marketing 
A 45-second teaser trailer of the film – involving an action sequence set in prison – was released on the eve of Haasan's 67th birthday (7 November 2021). In April 2022, the teaser was attached to the prints of K.G.F: Chapter 2 and Beast in theatres. As a part of the film's promotions, in collaboration with Southern Railways, the marketing team designed the film's posters at the locomotive trains travelling across India. The film's trailer was released at the audio launch event on 15 May 2022, and within 24 hours, the trailer crossed over 1.2 crore views.

Raajkamal Films International collaborated with Vistas Media Capital's Fantico and Lotus Metaentertainment, for the film's launch in the metaverse platform, Vistaverse. Vistaverse further announced the launch of utilities through non-fungible tokens (NFT), being unveiled at the 2022 Cannes Film Festival on 18 May 2022. Raajkamal further spearheaded the film's marketing campaign, with pre-release events being held in Mumbai, New Delhi, Kochi, Bangalore, Hyderabad, Dubai and Malaysia. Haasan further promoted the film at The Kapil Sharma Show, Super Singer 8, the fourth season of Bigg Boss Malayalam. and also in his YouTube debut by featuring in Village Cooking Channel, which appeared in a role in one of the film's scenes.

At the pre-release event held at PVR Priya-Vasant Vihar theatre in Delhi, PVR Cinemas in collaboration with Raajkamal Films, had announced that all theatres in Delhi owned by PVR will be rebranded as "PVR Vikram Hitlist". The film's Kerala distributor, Shibu Thameens, hosted a pre-release event at Lulu International Shopping Mall, Kochi on 27 May 2022. An event was held in Mumbai on 28 May, to promote the film's Hindi version. On 29 May, the film's press screening was held in Malaysia, with opposition leader Anwar Ibrahim, being the chief guest. Another pre-release event was held in Hyderabad on 31 May, with Venkatesh Daggubati and Nithiin felicitating the event. On 1 June, Haasan, Lokesh Kanagaraj and Anirudh attended the film's pre-release event in Dubai, with the theatrical trailer being showcased at Burj Khalifa.

The packaged water company, Bisleri had unveiled a limited edition water bottles featuring the cast of Vikram, for the promotions. The official Twitter emoji was released on 23 May 2022. On 27 May 2022, a special promo teasing the conference-call sequence from Haasan's Panchathanthiram (2002) was released, and featured the other lead actors from the original film, Jayaram, Yugi Sethu, Ramesh Aravind and Sriman. Post-release, the film was promoted at Times Square in New York City. Amul released a doodle inspired from the film, to celebrate the film's success.

 Release 
 Theatrical Vikram was theatrically released on 3 June 2022. It was initially scheduled for theatrical release in mid-April 2022. The film was later preponed to 31 March, and pushed back to 29 April, and then to June 2022, both times after the producers adjusted the release date due to the scheduling of several other big-budget films and production delays caused due to COVID-19 pandemic. The film was dubbed in Telugu and Hindi-languages under the title Vikram Hitlist.

 Screenings and statistics 
According to Tiruppur Subramanian, president of Tamil Nadu Theatre Owners Association (TNTOA), Vikram received the "widest release for Kamal Haasan film". The film opened in over 5,000 screens worldwide, with 700-800 screens in Tamil Nadu, 400 screens in Andhra Pradesh and Telangana, 100 screens across Kerala and 200 screens across Karnataka. The Hindi-dubbed version being released in over 1,000-1,500 screens in North India, competing with Akshay Kumar's Samrat Prithviraj and Adivi Sesh's Major. Prime Media, which acquired the theatrical rights in United States, hosted special shows in the country on 2 June, ahead of its Indian release. The film will be screened in over 500 theatres and exhibited in over 2,000 screens. Rakesh Gowthaman, managing director of Vettri Theatres, stated that the film's anticipation has been attributed to the rigorous promotions from the team. Film distributor and exhibitor Akshaye Rathi exclaimed about the possibilities of the film's performance in Northern belt, stating that "Vikram has an urban look and feel but the storytelling syntax seems very mass friendly. Kamal's recent movies were abstract and intellectually inaccessible for many. Vikram is a simple, hard-hitting, commercial cinema. It is as mainstream as it gets."

The advance bookings of Vikram began on 29 May 2022. The early morning shows, were held at 4:00 a.m. across Tamil Nadu. In May 2022, a petition was filed in order to stop screening of 4:00 a.m. shows from the film, claiming that theatre owners may extort high charges from the ticket rate and estimated that tax evasion on these shows, may claim huge loss for the makers, though the issue was later resolved. Horizon Studios, which distributed the film in Karnataka, allotted early morning shows beginning 6:30 a.m. Tony Raj, the film's distributor, claimed that with this estimate, the film will receive over 1,200 shows a day in the state.

A week ahead of its release, the Madras High Court restrained ISPs and over 1,000 unauthorized piracy sites for illegal streaming and downloading of the film, after one of the executives from production company filed an affidavit regarding the same name.

 Distribution 
Trade pundits claimed the film as the "hottest in the trade". The film made a business of about  before the release, from theatrical and non-theatrical revenues, including satellite, digital, audio and Hindi dubbing rights. In late-March 2022, Udhayanidhi Stalin's Red Giant Movies acquired the film's theatrical distribution rights in Tamil Nadu. Jayantilal Gada's Pen Studios acquired the theatrical rights for the Hindi-dubbed version and the film was distributed by Pen's distribution division, Pen Marudhar Entertainment. Shree Karpaga Vinayaga Film Circuits has acquired the Karnataka distribution rights of the film. The Andhra Pradesh and Telangana distribution rights, have been acquired by Sreshth Movies. The overseas theatrical rights of the film were acquired by AP International, excluding United States, where the film was distributed by Prime Media. Hamsini Entertainment and Ahimsa Entertainment, acquired the theatrical rights for United Kingdom and Europe, the latter, additionally distributed the film in Australia and New Zealand.

 Home media and screenplay
It was then confirmed that the satellite rights of the film have been sold to Star Vijay. The film was streamed through Disney+ Hotstar from 8 July 2022 in Tamil and dubbed versions of Telugu, Hindi, Malayalam and Kannada languages and two months later, on September 13, 2022, started streaming on ZEE5 in all five languages. The Telugu-language version of the film was premiered on television on 11 September 2022 on Star Maa. The Hindi-language version of the film was premiered on 24 September 2022 on Star Gold. The original Tamil-language version was premiered on 24 October 2022 on Star Vijay, coinciding with the Diwali festival. The Malayalam dubbed version of the film had its television premiere on 6 November 2022 on Asianet.

The film's screenplay was released in the form of a book published by Pesamozhi Publications.

 Film festival 
The film made it to 'Open Cinema' section of 27th Busan International Film Festival and was screened at the hallmark outdoor theater on 7 October 2022.

 Reception 
It entered the 100-crore club within two day of its release. Vikram had a total gross collection of  crore in India and  crore overseas making the first weekend collection to  crore gross worldwide. The film collected over  crores in Tamil Nadu,  crores in Kerala,  crores in Karnataka,  crores in Telugu states and  crores in rest of India.

In its opening weekend the film had collected  crore in USA,  crore in UK  and  crore in Australia. The film grossed  worldwide with in seven days. On the fourth day of its release, the film collected around $2.10 million in Russia, $2.65 million in Middle East, $1.25 million in Malaysia, $0.46 million in Singapore, $0.22 million in France, $0.50 million in Europe. On the sixth day of its release, the film crossed the 200 crores mark, surpassing the collections made by the Tamil film Beast. The film has also performed well in Norway and Russia, grossing $31,320 and $6,543 respectively on the first week of its release.Vikram grossed over  crore in the first week of its theatrical run, and emerged as the highest-grossing Tamil film of the year by surpassing Beast at that point of time.

 Critical response Vikram received highly positive reviews from critics and audiences.

Divya Nair of Rediff rated the film 4 out of 5 stars and wrote "With ample whistle podu moments, Vikram is a macho blockbuster that shouldn't be missed". Soundarya Athimuthu of The Quint rated the film 4 out of 5 stars and wrote "Lokesh Kanagaraj has loaded Vikram with a battalion of characters but he has ensured that all of them have their due scope to perform, even though some might have lesser screen time including Ulaganaayagan". A critic for Pinkvilla rated the film 3.5 out of 5 stars and wrote "Kamal Haasan is a visual delight in this action thriller". Ashameera Aiyappan of Firstpost rated the film 3.5 out of 5 stars and wrote "One glimpse of Kamal Haasan in Lokesh Kanagaraj's Vikram and you just know he is the G.O.A.T". Sowmya Rajendran of The News Minute rated the film 3.5 out of 5 stars and wrote "Lokesh must be applauded for not wasting time on fanboy tributes to the superstar on board, and sticking to telling the story". Manoj Kumar R of The Indian Express rated the film 3.5 out of 5 stars and wrote "Vikram is only the beginning. In the climax, Lokesh teases at least three separate movies that could branch out from this one. A critic for Zee News rated the film 3.5 out of 5 stars and wrote "Vikram works if one looks at it as just an action entertainer". Vivek M V of Deccan Herald rated the film 3.5 out of 5 stars and wrote "Lokesh has found his own voice and his fast yet admirable growth promises exciting things going forward". Josh Hurtado of The Austin Chronicle rated the film 3.5 out of 5 stars and wrote "An incredible booming background score from Anirudh Ravichandar, and some very fun surprises throughout, Vikram is definitely among the year's best Tamil films". Haricharan Pudipeddi of Hindustan Times stated that "Anirudh Ravichander's music, especially the background score, plays a pivotal role in amplifying the overall experience of watching Vikram on the big screen, apart from the terrific action sequences. Suriya's brief but powerful cameo is just the high one needs as you step out of Vikram." Srivatsan S of The Hindu stated that "The new ‘Vikram’ disappoints the fans of the 1986 original and could have been a standalone film with Fahadh Faasil carrying on the legacy of the agent like in the James Bond films."

Lakshmi Subramanian of The Week rated the film 3.5 out of 5 stars and wrote "Vikram is packed with thrilling moments from the very first minute. With technical superiority and terrific casting, the first half is an interesting watch, while the narration and a few long rants tire you in the second half". Saibal Chatterjee of NDTV rated the film 3 out of 5 stars and wrote "Kamal Haasan is fabulous. Vijay Sethupathi fleshes out an edgy criminal whose frazzled heart and addled mind push him in startling directions". M Suganth of The Times Of India rated the film 3 out of 5 stars and wrote "In a film filled with action heroes, the biggest mass moment comes in a stunt scene involving a female character. Vikram needed a few more such moments to have been truly memorable". Janani K of India Today rated the film 3 out of 5 stars and wrote "Vikram has several whistle-worthy moments. But, the plot becomes too generic after a point". Gautaman Bhaskaran of News 18 rated the film 2.5 out of 5 stars and wrote "Vikram is drama, drama, drama all the way in which the director has not only bitten more than he can chew but exhibits his diehard admiration for Kamal Haasan". Sudhir Srinivasan of The New Indian Express rated the film 3 out of 5 and wrote "Much like the morality of both characters, I'll have to say it lies somewhere in between, and much like those two men, the film does tilt towards the good." Ananda Vikatan rated the film 44 out of 100. Behindwoods gave the film’s rating 3 out of 5 stars and stated that "Kamal, VJS, Fahadh, Lokesh & Anirudh deliver an entertaining Vikram with amazing performances, terrific music, surprise twists and stylish stunts." The Hans India gave it 3 out of 5 stars and wrote "On the whole, Vikram is all for action lovers and movie buffs as it is the best entertaining movie that hit the screens these days! A perfect concoction of action and mystery turned it out into a blockbuster!" Dinamalar rated the film 3.5 out of 5 stars. A critic named Ashwin Ram of Moviecrow rated the film 3 out of 5 and wrote that "Vikram is interesting with a lot of layers and angles, but the presentation falls short of a solid punch."

 Future 

 Sequel 
Owing to the film's success, Kamal Haasan in an interview with Pinkvilla, asserted the possibility of a sequel to Vikram, and there were also reports stating that the film would have a third sequel to Vikram'', which will be part of Lokesh Cinematic Universe (LCU).

Notes

References

External links 

2020s police procedural films
2020s spy films
2020s Tamil-language films
2022 crime action films
2022 films
Fictional portrayals of the Tamil Nadu Police
Films about drugs
Films about organised crime in India
Films about special forces
Films about the illegal drug trade
Films about the Narcotics Control Bureau
Films about the Research and Analysis Wing
Films scored by Anirudh Ravichander
Films set in 1987
Films set in 2019
Films set in Chennai
Films set in Mumbai
Films set in Uttar Pradesh
Films shot in Coimbatore
Films shot in Karaikudi
Films shot in Mumbai
Films shot in Puducherry
Indian action thriller films
Indian detective films
Indian films about revenge
Indian gangster films
Indian nonlinear narrative films
Indian police films
Indian sequel films
Indian vigilante films
Intelligence Bureau (India) in fiction
Films shot in Chennai
Films set in San Francisco
Films directed by Lokesh Kanagaraj
Indian intellectual property law